Paraplatyptilia watkinsi is a moth of the family Pterophoridae. It is found in North America, including the type location Burnett County, Wisconsin. It has also been recorded from Vermont.

Paraplatyptilia watkinsi and Paraplatyptilia sabourini are cryptic species differentiated by diagnostic character in female genitalia.

References

Moths described in 2008
watkinsi
Endemic fauna of the United States
Moths of North America